Constantin Stan (born 20 October 1949) is a Romanian former footballer who played as a forward. The stadium from his native Colceag is named after him.

International career
Constantin Stan played three games at international level for Romania, including one appearance at the Euro 1980 qualifiers. He scored one goal in a friendly which ended 1–1 against Israel.

Honours
Gloria Buzău
Divizia B: 1977–78
Divizia C: 1971–72

References

1949 births
Living people
Romanian footballers
Romania international footballers
Association football forwards
Liga I players
Liga II players
ASA Târgu Mureș (1962) players
FC Gloria Buzău players